IEEE Access is a peer-reviewed open-access scientific journal published by the Institute of Electrical and Electronics Engineers (IEEE). It was established in 2013 and covers all IEEE fields of interest. The founding editor-in-chief was Michael Pecht (University of Maryland) and the current editor-in-chief is Derek Abbott ( University of Adelaide). The journal won a PROSE Award in 2015 for the best new journal in science, technology, engineering, and mathematics.

The journal is gold open access and charges a $1,850 Article Processing Charge which is scheduled to rise to $1,950 in 2023.

Special sections
The journal hosts special sections that highlight a specific topic of general IEEE interest. Associate editors propose a concentration area that emphasizes applications-oriented and interdisciplinary topics. Together with the editorial staff a "Call for Papers" is then sent to academic and industrial researchers soliciting the submissions of manuscripts that identify and discuss technical challenges and recent results on the topic of that section.

Abstracting and indexing
The journal is abstracted and indexed in:
Current Contents/Engineering, Computing & Technology
EBSCO databases
Ei Compendex
Inspec
Science Citation Index Expanded
Scopus

References

External links

Access
Open access journals
Publications established in 2013
English-language journals
Engineering journals